Suéliton Florencio Nogueira (born 26 June 1991), simply known as Suéliton, is a Brazilian footballer who plays as a central defender for Betim Futebol Clube.

Club career
Suéliton was born in Guarabira, Paraíba. A Campinense youth graduate, he made his first team debut on 1 August 2010, in a 2–0 home win against Salgueiro for the Série C championship.

In 2011 Suéliton moved to Ponte Preta, but failed to make a single appearance for the club during his spell. He subsequently moved to Mogi Mirim in the following year, but only appeared in two Série D matches.

In 2012 Suéliton returned to his native state, after agreeing to a contract with CSP. After being initially assigned to the youth setup, he was promoted to the main squad in 2014, appearing regularly in the year's Campeonato Paraibano.

On 19 February 2014 Suéliton was loaned to ABC, until the end of the year. He made his professional debut on 19 April, in a 1–1 Série B away draw against Santa Cruz.

Suéliton scored his first professional goal on 6 September 2014, netting his team's second in a 2–1 home win against the same opponent. On 13 February 2015, he was signed outright.

On 21 December 2015 Suéliton was loaned to América Mineiro, newly promoted to Série A, for one year.

Honours 
ABC
 Copa RN: 2015

América Mineiro
 Campeonato Mineiro: 2016

Cuiabá
 Campeonato Mato-Grossense: 2017

References

External links

1991 births
Living people
Sportspeople from Paraíba
Brazilian footballers
Association football defenders
Campeonato Brasileiro Série A players
Campeonato Brasileiro Série B players
Campeonato Brasileiro Série C players
Campeonato Brasileiro Série D players
Campinense Clube players
Bolivian Primera División players
Associação Atlética Ponte Preta players
Mogi Mirim Esporte Clube players
Centro Sportivo Paraibano players
ABC Futebol Clube players
América Futebol Clube (MG) players
Cuiabá Esporte Clube players
Red Bull Brasil players
Esporte Clube Santo André players
Clube Náutico Capibaribe players
Oriente Petrolero players
Ituano FC players
Brazilian expatriate footballers
Brazilian expatriate sportspeople in Portugal
Expatriate footballers in Portugal
Brazilian expatriate sportspeople in Bolivia
Expatriate footballers in Bolivia
Vitória S.C. B players
Liga Portugal 2 players